Igny Abbey or Val d'Igny Abbey (Abbaye Notre-Dame du Val d'Igny) is a Cistercian abbey located in Arcis-le-Ponsart, Marne, France. It was founded in 1128 for Cistercian monks, dissolved in 1791 during the French Revolution, re-established in 1876 for Trappist monks, destroyed in 1918, reopened in 1929 for Trappist nuns and modernised in 2008–12 to accommodate three or four pre-existing communities.

History

Origins and Zenith 
Igny Abbey was founded by the Archbishop of Reims, Rainaud II de Martigny, who provided land at Igny. In 1128, Bernard of Clairvaux sent twelve monks from Clairvaux to Igny to establish it under Humbert, previously prior of Clairvaux, as the first abbot (Igny is thus of the filiation of Clairvaux).

The community at Igny prospered sufficiently under Humbert to be able to found a daughter house, Signy Abbey, in 1135. He was succeeded in 1138 by Guerric of Igny, best known for his sermons, later beatified. His relics are still venerated in Igny, and are preserved in the church's side chapel.

A second daughter house, Valroy Abbey, was founded in 1147.

In 1177, Abbot Gerard of Clairvaux, later Blessed Gerard, was murdered at Igny by a certain Hugh of Bazoches, a monk whom he had threatened with disciplinary action, thus becoming the first Cistercian martyr.

Despite this incident, the abbey flourished and in its heyday housed over 500 monks and owned more than 5,000 hectares of land.

As with other Cistercian monasteries, growth at Igny slowed from the later 13th century. In the 14th century the abbey suffered badly from the effects of the Hundred Years' War; large gifts from Gaucher V de Châtillon enabled it to rebuild in 1378. Decline continued, however.

Later Fortunes 
In 1545 the abbey was placed under commendatory abbots, at which time the community consisted of 72 monks. Further damage occurred during the French Wars of Religion in the later 16th century, during which the monastery was pillaged by Huguenots. After still more pillaging suffered during the Thirty Years' War and the Franco-Spanish War, the number of monks had fallen to seven.

In 1733 the church was destroyed and a new one built, which was completed along with other new buildings in 1789, the beginning of the French Revolution. In 1790 all religious houses in France were suppressed; in April 1791 the six monks then living there were turned out and the abbey's assets were declared national property and sold off.

The monastic premises passed into private hands but in 1876 were reacquired by the Archdiocese of Reims for the establishment of a Trappist monastery by a community of monks from the Abbey of Sainte-Marie-du-Désert. The new monastery was at first a priory but was raised to an abbey in 1886. The new community funded themselves mostly by the manufacture of chocolate.

In 1914 the German army appropriated the premises, wrecking the chocolate factory, and turned them into a hospital for infectious diseases. Just before the Second Battle of the Marne in May 1918 the buildings were evacuated; when retreating on 6 August 1918, the Germans blew them up, destroying the entire abbey with the exception of the small library.

The abbey was rebuilt in 1927-1929 and occupied in November 1929 by a community of 32 Trappist nuns from Laval Abbey. In 1955 Igny founded the first house of Cistercian nuns in Africa, the Abbaye Notre-Dame de la Clarté Dieu at Murhesa in South Kivu, in the Democratic Republic of the Congo.

Present Nunnery 
In 2007 the structure of Cistercian communities throughout northern France was re-thought, and the order decided that three communities of nuns should be brought together at Igny: Igny's existing community and those of la Grâce-Dieu and Belval (subsequently the small community of Ubexy was also included). A major re-building consequently took place. In 2011 the four existing communities were installed, which almost doubled the size of the previous population of Igny, as the new community of the Abbaye Notre-Dame du Val d'Igny.

Abbots and abbesses

Cistercian abbots
 1128-1138: Humbert
 1138-1157: Guerric I (Bl Guerric of Igny)
 1157-1162: Geoffrey of Auxerre
 1162-1164: Bernard
 1164-1169: Hugh
 1169-1179: Pierre I Monoculus (Pierre le Borgne)
 1179-1186: Gerard I
 1186-1189: Julien (1)
 1189-1190: Videbatius
 1190-1205: Julien (2)
 1205-1232: Nicolas I
 1232-1234: Jean I
 1234-1237: Gilbert
 1238-1239: Anscher
 1239-1245: Pierre II of Bar
 1245-1254: Thibaud I
 1254-1270: Pierre III
 1270-1284: Gerard II
 1284-1290: Jean II de Pontoise
 1291-1292: Nicolas II
 1292-1300: Alard I
 1301-1307: Guerric II
 1307-1327: John III
 1327-1332: Pons I Wassigny
 1333-1345: Alard II
 1345-1355: Jean IV Cohan
 1356-13??: Jean V Oiselet
 13?? -13??: Pons II
 13?? -13??: Ogier I Bezannes
 13?? -1378: Laurent
 1378-1399: William
 1399-1419: Jacques
 1419-1445: Nicolas III Unchair
 1445-1460: Thibaud II of Luxembourg
 1460-1476: Jean VI de Montigny
 1476-1488: Nicolas IV Suippes
 1488-1498: Ogier II La Grange
 1498-1501: Nicolas V
 1501-1504: Jean Renauld VII
 1504-1506: Denis
 1506-1545: Jean VIII Scépeaux

Commendatory abbots
 1545-1553: Louis I de Foligny
 1553-1589: Louis II de Breze
 1589-1625: Alexandre de La Marck
 1625-1661: Louis III de La Marck
 1661-1709: Paul Godet des Marais de la Marck
 1709-1746: Charles-François des Moustiers Mérinville
 1746-1759: Francis Jerome de Montigny
 1760-1776: Justinian Boffin Puisigneux
 1777-1790: Jean-Charles de Courcy

Trappist priors and abbot
 1876-1881: Nivard Fournier, prior
 1881-1886: Augustin Marre, prior
 1886-1922: Augustin Marre, Abbot

Trappist abbesses
 1933-1936: Mary I Gastineau Alphonse
 1936-1948: Marie Deschamps Lucia II
 1948-1951: Andrée Lavaux (1)
 1951-1956: Lutgarde Lehalle
 1956-1958: Andrée Lavaux (2)
 1958-1969: Marie III Aleth Girondelot
 1970-1999: Marie Denis IV Aelred
 1999-2008: Marie Rose V Flanders
 2008–2014: Inès Gravier, apostolic administrator
 2014–present: Isabelle Valez

References

Sources
 Abbaye d'Igny website 

Cistercian monasteries in France
Christian monasteries in Marne (department)
1128 establishments in Europe
1120s establishments in France
Religious organizations established in the 1120s
Christian monasteries established in the 12th century